John Valentine Incoll (14 February 1879 – 22 May 1961) was an Australian rules footballer who played for the South Melbourne Football Club and Collingwood Football Club in the Victorian Football League (VFL).

Family
The son of Frank Tychicus Incoll (1840-1905), and his second wife, Margaret Incoll (1840-1929), née Nicholas, John Valentine Incoll was born at Ballarat East, Victoria on 14 February 1879.

He married Florence Laura Mills (1881-1939) in 1901. They had two sons, and three daughters  one of whom died aged 20 months, as the result of burns she received when her dress caught fire.

Football
Incoll started his career at South Melbourne but it wasn't until he went to Collingwood in 1902 that he established himself as a VFL footballer. He played in Collingwood's 1902 and 1903 premiership sides and at one stage the club strung together 16 consecutive wins with him in the team. Incoll was also a member of the side which lost the 1905 Grand Final.

Used in a variety of positions, he spent a lot of his time in the forward line and was also pushed back in defence on occasions. Incoll was a fill in ruckman when Collingwood won the 1903 premiership. In a game against St Kilda in the 1905 VFL season he kicked a career best six goals, his next best from his 72 games was two goals which he achieved numerous times. He finished his career in New South Wales and represented the state at the 1911 Adelaide Carnival.

Military service
He enlisted in the First AIF on 6 September 1915, served overseas, was wounded in action in France, and returned to Australia on 12 May 1918,  and was discharged on medical grounds.

Death
He died at the Repatriation General Hospital, Daw Park on 22 May 1961.

Notes

References
 Holmesby, Russell and Main, Jim (2007). The Encyclopedia of AFL Footballers. 7th ed. Melbourne: Bas Publishing.
 First World War Nominal Roll: Private John Valentine Incoll (4499), collection of the Australian War Memorial.
 First World War Embarkation Roll: Private John Valentine Incoll (4499), collection of the Australian War Memorial.
 First World War Service Record: Private John Valentine Incoll (4499), National Archives of Australia.
 John Valentine Incoll, at New South Wales Australian Football History Society.

External links

1879 births
1961 deaths
Australian rules footballers from Victoria (Australia)
Australian Rules footballers: place kick exponents
Sydney Swans players
Collingwood Football Club players
Collingwood Football Club Premiership players
Two-time VFL/AFL Premiership players
North Broken Hill Football Club players
West Torrens Football Club players